Cypress Creek High School is located in Orlando, Florida, and serves students in grades 9 through 12.

Cypress Creek is an IB World School with an International Baccalaureate Diploma Program. As an IB World School, CCHS is a local magnet school allowing students from other Orange County, Florida schools to attend.

Cypress Creek High School receives graduating students from Meadow Woods Middle School, South Creek Middle School and Walker Middle School.  However, it is a magnet school, so students from surrounding middle schools (e.g. Hunters Creek Middle School, Freedom Middle School, Westridge Middle School, Lake Nona Middle School, Southwest Middle School) also attend Cypress Creek albeit in smaller numbers.

Band

The Cypress Creek Band has developed a proud tradition of excellence since the school opened on August 24, 1992. The Cypress Creek High School Band Program is dedicated to providing educational and artistic opportunities for its students in the performing arts. All educational activities will take place in a professional atmosphere, which promotes social and artistic development of students through creative and innovative programs, each based upon high quality instruction and leadership. In addition, it is our belief that “the process is just as important as the product.” This places the emphasis on the development and growth of each individual student, not on specific performances or placements.

The Cypress Creek Marching Band is a seven-time Florida Marching Band Coalition Class 4A Champion (in 1998, 1999, 2000, 2001, 2002, 2007, and 2010) and was named Grand Champion an unprecedented five times (1998–2002) before FMBC eliminated the Grand Champion title (now only class champions are named) The marching band was a Bands of America Grand Nationals Semi-Finalist two times, in 2000 and 2002, finishing in the top 20. Recently the Cypress Creek Marching Band was a Bands of America Orlando regional finalist placing 7th in 2018 and 9th in 2021. 

The Cypress Creek Wind Ensemble has been guest-conducted by composers including Karel Husa (in 1996) and David Holsinger (in 2002).  The group has performed at venues and festivals including Bands of America Marching and Concert Festivals in 1997 and 2000, and Carnegie Hall in April 2009. In 2011 the Wind Ensemble also performed for the second time at the Music for All National Concert Band Festival in Indianapolis, Indiana.

The Cypress Creek High School Winter Guard has competed in the Dayton, Ohio WGI World Championships since 1999. They have been finalists in the WGI competitions seven times since the school's opening. Recently the Cypress Creek Winter Guard finished 2nd at the FFCC Championships in class AA in 2022. 

Under the direction of Leonardo Lamos and Michael Tabone.

IB Diploma Program
The IB DP at Cypress Creek is notably recognized as performing among the top 1% of IB schools worldwide in regard to graduation rates within the program. The program starts with the Pre-IB curriculum in the first two years of high school. Students enter the program officially in their Junior year. The program is outlined as follows:
 IB Group 1 subjects: AP Literature and Composition (Junior Year), IB English HL IV
 IB Group 2 subjects: IB German SL or IB Spanish SL. 
 IB Group 3 subjects: IB History of the Americas HL, IB Psychology HL or SL, IB ITGS
 IB Group 4 subjects: IB Biology HL or SL, IB Chemistry HL or SL, IB Physics SL
 IB Group 5 subjects: AP Calculus AB (Junior Year for Maths HL and SL), IB Math Studies SL, IB Mathematics HL or SL
 IB Group 6 subjects: IB Art, IB Theater, IB Music, IB Film
 Students are also required to complete a Theory of Knowledge class, Creativity, Action, Service (CAS) hours, and an Extended Essay.
The Cypress Creek German Program is also the largest German learning program in the state of Florida and among the most successful in national German language competitions.

Notable people
Amar'e Stoudemire, NBA basketball player, now playing for Hapoel Jerusalem of the Israeli Basketball Premier League and the EuroCup (Class of 2002),
Jammie Kirlew (Class of 2005), football player
Christopher Duffy (baseball) (Class of 2006), baseball player
Mauricio Henao (Class of 2005), telenovela actor

References

External links
Official site
Cypress Creek High School Performance

Educational institutions established in 1992
High schools in Orange County, Florida
Orange County Public Schools
Schools in Orlando, Florida
Public high schools in Florida
Magnet schools in Florida
1992 establishments in Florida